Abdullah Ropri or Abdullah Muhaddis Ropri or Hafiz Abdullah Ropri, (Abdullah Ropri, 1895 ADAugust 20, 1964 AD, 1303 AH - 11 Rabiʽ al-Thani 1384 AH) was an Islamic scholar, historian, mufti, commentator and muhaddith of Indian Subcontinent. He was a scholar of Hadith. Ropri was an Indian freedom fighter but after the creation of Muslim League he became an activist of Tehreek-e-Pakistan. He was one of the notable leaders of Ahl-i Hadees. He was one of the founders of Jamaat Ahle hadith Pakistan.

Early life and education 
Abdullah Ropari was born in 1895 in a town of Amritsar district of British India. His father name was Miyan Roshan Deen. His ancestors were originally from Aminpur village in Gujranwala District. During the reign of Maharaja of Punjab, Ranjit Singh, some members of his family got lands in Amritsar district of British India and moved there. Abdullah was born here. Abdullah Ropari received his religious education from Molvi Abdullah, who was famous Islamic scholar of the town, in Chunian city where he memorised Quran. He went to Meerut and Delhi for further religious education. He received his hadith degree from Abdul Mannan Wazirabadi.

In 1915, after completing the education, Ropari moved to Ambala, Haryana, and stayed there till 1937. Ropari open a religious school (Madarsa), Darul Hadees and started career as teacher.

After partition 
In 1947, Abdullah Ropari moved to Lahore from Amritsar after the partition of India, where he opened a religious school named, Madarsa Ahle hadees and a mosque named, Jama al-Quds Ahle hadees.

Death 
Abdullah Ropari died on 20 August 1964 AD, 11 Rabiʽ al-Thani 1384 AH in Lahore, Pakistan. His funeral prayers were led by Muhammad Gondalwi and he was buried in the cemetery of Garden Town, Lahore.

Works 
Abdullah Ropari has written books in Urdu and Arabic. His books include:

 Tafseer Al Quran Al Kareem
 Ladki Shadi Kyon Karti Hai

Al-Kitab Al-Mastatab 
Al-Kitab Al-Mastatab Fi Jawab Fasal Al-Khitab, In this book Abdullah Ropari commented on Anwar Shah Kashmiri's Fasal Al-Khitab.

Fatwa Ahle Hadees 
It's the book of fatwa of Abdullah. This book is most popular among Ahle Hadees.

See also 
 Abdul Mannan Wazirabadi
 Muhammad Ibrahim Mir Sialkoti
 Sanaullah Amritsari
Muhammad Sulaiman Salman Mansoorpuri

Notes

Bibliography 

 
 
 
 
 

1895 births
1964 deaths
Pakistani Sunni Muslim scholars of Islam
Pakistan Movement activists
Pakistan Movement activists from Punjab
Death in Lahore
Pakistani people of Indian descent
Ahl-i Hadith people
People from Rupnagar